Rosalia is an unincorporated community in Butler County, Kansas, United States. As of the 2020 census, the population of the community and nearby areas was 149.

History
Rosalia was platted in 1883. The town was named by its first postmaster for his wife.

In 2014 and 2018, the Symphony In The Flint Hills, an outdoor symphony music event, was held a few miles northeast of Rosalia.  In 2014, the attendance was over 7000 people.

Geography

Climate
The climate in this area is characterized by hot, humid summers and generally mild to cool winters.  According to the Köppen Climate Classification system, Rosalia has a humid subtropical climate, abbreviated "Cfa" on climate maps.

Demographics

For statistical purposes, the United States Census Bureau has defined Rosalia as a census-designated place (CDP).

Government
Rosalia has a post office with ZIP code 67132. The post office was established in 1870.

Education
The community is served by Flinthills USD 492 public school district.  The Flinthills High School mascot is the Mustangs.

References

Further reading

External links
 Butler County maps: Current, Historic, KDOT

Census-designated places in Butler County, Kansas
Census-designated places in Kansas